Eskil is a town in Aksaray Province in the Central Anatolia region of Turkey, situated on the southern shore of Lake Tuz. It is the seat of Eskil District. Its population is 17,929 (2021).

History
The history of the region dates back to the Old Bronze Age (3rd millennium BC).

The first place of establishment of Eskil, which is mostly referred to as "Old province" in ancient sources, is today known as Gavuroreni and is located in the far north of the district, near Salt Lake. With the Anatolian Seljuk domination, Sultan II. The region was Turkified by placing Turkish tribes in Eskil and its surroundings by Kılıçarslan.

It is stated in the Ottoman Avekaleilayşivi Provincial Writings book of the Presidency that it was centered on the Esk-Kâlen Kazalar group, which was affiliated with the Eskil'in Eyalman' Province during the Ottomans. Historical ruins can be found in Eskil, which has large settlements. There are mounds in Böğet Village, Ortakuyu, Köşk, Hüyüklü, Mutlu, Çulfa, Sağsak and Tosun Highlands, and remains of architectural artifacts are found.

References

External links
 District municipality's official website 
 Aksaray governor's office 
 Eskil Television and Radio Eskil 

Populated places in Aksaray Province
Eskil District
Towns in Turkey
Lycaonia